Kittel Halvorson (December 15, 1846 – July 12, 1936) was a U.S. Representative from Minnesota.

Biography
Kittel Halvorson was born near Tuddal in Hjartdal parish, Telemark, Norway. In 1848, he immigrated to the United States with his parents, who settled near Whitewater, Walworth County, Wisconsin. They subsequently moved to Columbia County and then to Winnebago County. He attended the public schools in Winchester, Wisconsin. In 1863, Halvorson enlisted in Company C, First Regiment, Wisconsin Heavy Artillery, and served until the close of the Civil War. His service record included participation in the Battle of Missionary Ridge and the Battle of Chattanooga.

Halvorson moved to Minnesota in November 1865 and homesteaded near Belgrade, Stearns County where he engaged in agricultural pursuits and stock raising. He served as justice of the peace 1870 – 1875; chairman of the board of supervisors 1870–1880; township assessor in 1880; town clerk 1880 – 1891 and member of the Minnesota House of Representatives 1886–1888. He was elected as a Populist to the 52nd United States Congress, (March 4, 1891 – March 3, 1893). He was an unsuccessful candidate for reelection in 1892 to the 53rd Congress. He resumed agricultural pursuits near Brooten, Stearns County, Minnesota. He served as an alternate delegate to the Populist Party National Convention in 1896. He moved to Tewaukon Township, Sargent County, North Dakota  in 1900 and engaged in agricultural pursuits. He was an unsuccessful candidate for representative from North Dakota for the Socialist Party of America in 1906. He returned to Minnesota in 1910 and resuming farming in North Fork until 1924, when he retired. 

Halvorson died in Havana, North Dakota, on July 12, 1936. His interment was at Big Grove  Lutheran Church Cemetery, North Fork Township, near Brooten, Minnesota.

Note

References

Related Reading
Goodwyn, Lawrence  (1978) The Populist Moment: A Short History of the Agrarian Revolt in America (Oxford University Press) 

1846 births
1936 deaths
People from Telemark
People from Hjartdal
American Lutherans
Norwegian emigrants to the United States
People of Wisconsin in the American Civil War
People's Party members of the United States House of Representatives from Minnesota
Minnesota Populists
Members of the Minnesota House of Representatives
Burials in Minnesota
Members of the United States House of Representatives from Minnesota
Union Army soldiers